Amaruk Golf Club is a public golf course located in Happy Valley–Goose Bay, Newfoundland and Labrador, Canada. A 9-hole golf course, it was constructed in the 1950s to serve American servicemen stationed at Goose Air Force Base and British servicemen stationed at RAFU Goose Bay.

See also
List of golf courses in Newfoundland and Labrador

References

External links
Official website

Golf clubs and courses in Newfoundland and Labrador